Manohar Lal may refer to:
Manohar Lal Khattar
Manohar Lal Munjal
Manohar Lal Chibber
Manohar Lal Panth, a politician from the Indian state of Uttar Pradesh
Manohar Lal Sharma
Manohar Lal Sondhi
Manohar Lal (politician)
Manohar Lal (economist)